The Three Patriarchs (formerly known as the Three Wise Men) is a set of three sandstone monoliths on the west side of Zion Canyon in Zion National Park in Washington County, Utah, United States. The three main peaks were named by Frederick Fisher in 1916 for the biblical figures Abraham, Isaac and Jacob. The Court of the Patriarchs is the  cliff that runs along the south face of the Three Partiarchs.

Climate
Spring and fall are the most favorable seasons to visit th Three Patriarchs. According to the Köppen climate classification system, it is located in a cold semi-arid climate zone, which is defined by the coldest month having an average mean temperature below 32 °F (0 °C), and at least 50% of the total annual precipitation being received during the spring and summer.

Gallery

See also

 List of Mountains in Utah
 Geology of the Zion and Kolob canyons area
 Abraham Peak
 Isaac Peak
 Jacob Peak

References

External links

Landforms of Washington County, Utah
Landmarks in Utah
Mountains of Utah
Zion National Park